Mikhail Kazlow (born 12 February 1990) is a Belarusian professional football player currently playing for Neman Grodno.

External links
 
 

1990 births
Living people
People from Mogilev
Sportspeople from Mogilev Region
Belarusian footballers
Association football defenders
FC Dnepr Mogilev players
FC Vitebsk players
FC Dinamo Minsk players
FC Neman Grodno players